Sustainable Development Goal 1 (SDG 1 or Global Goal 1), one of the 17 Sustainable Development Goals established by the United Nations in 2015, calls for the end of poverty in all forms. The official wording is: "No Poverty". Member countries have pledged to "Leave No One Behind": underlying the goal is a "powerful commitment to leave no one behind and to reach those farthest behind first". SDG 1 aims to eradicate every form of extreme poverty including the lack of food, clean drinking water, and sanitation. Achieving this goal includes finding solutions to new threats caused by climate change and conflict. SDG 1 focuses not just on people living in poverty, but also on the services people rely on and social policy that either promotes or prevents poverty.

The goal has seven targets and 13 indicators to measure progress. The five outcome targets are: eradication of extreme poverty; reduction of all poverty by half; implementation of social protection systems; ensuring equal rights to ownership, basic services, technology and economic resources; and the building of resilience to environmental, economic and social disasters. The two targets related to means of implementation SDG 1 are mobilization of resources to end poverty; and the establishment of poverty eradication policy frameworks at all levels.

Despite the ongoing progress, 10 percent of the world's population live in poverty and struggle to meet basic needs such as health, education, and access to water and sanitation. Extreme poverty remains prevalent in low-income countries, particularly those affected by conflict and political upheaval. In 2015, more than half of the world's 736 million people living in extreme poverty lived in Sub-Saharan Africa. The rural poverty rate stands at 17.2 percent and 5.3 percent in urban areas (in 2016). 

One of the key indicators that measure poverty is the proportion of population living below the international and national poverty line. Measuring the proportion of the population covered by social protection systems and living in households with access to basic services is also an indication of the level of poverty.

Background 

In 2013, an estimated 385 million children lived on less than US$1.90 per day. These figures are unreliable due to huge gaps in data on the status of children worldwide.

Since 1990, countries around the world have taken various measures to reduce poverty and achieved remarkable results. The number of people living in extreme poverty decreased from 1.8 billion to 776 million in 2013. Still, people continue to live in poverty with the World Bank estimating that 40 million to 60 million people will fall into extreme poverty in 2020. Changes relative to higher poverty lines, not just extreme poverty, are also tracked.

Targets, indicators and progress 

Poverty eradication is important for the reduction of inequalities that currently exist among people and for the socio-economic and political stability of countries left behind. The UN defined 7 Targets and 14 Indicators for SDG 1. The main data source for SDG 1 indicators (including maps) come from Our World in Data's SDG Tracker. The targets cover a wide range of issues including the eradication of extreme poverty (target 1.1), reduction of poverty by half (1.2), implementation of social protection systems (1.3), ensuring equal rights to ownership, basic services, technology and economic resources (1.4), building of resilience towards environmental, economic and social disasters (1.5), and mobilization of resources to end poverty (1.6).

Targets specify the goals while indicators represent the metrics by which the world aims to track whether these targets are achieved. SDG 1 has two specific poverty reduction targets: eradicating extreme poverty (target 1.1) and reduce poverty by half by 2030 (target 1.2).

Five of the targets are to be reached by 2030, and two have no specified date.

Target 1.1: Eradicate extreme poverty 
 
The full text of Target 1.1 is: "By 2030, eradicate extreme poverty for all people everywhere, currently measured as people living on less than $1.90 a day."

Target 1.1 includes one indicator: Indicator 1.1.1 is the "Proportion of population living below the international poverty line aggregated by sex, age, employment status, and geographical location (urban/rural)".

It was reported in 2020 that "The share of the world’s workers living in extreme poverty fell by half over the last decade: from 14.3 per cent in 2010 to 7.1 per cent in 2019".

A study published in September 2020 found that extreme poverty had increased by 7 percent in just a few months, after a steady decrease for the last 20 years.

Target 1.2: Reduce poverty by at least 50%  
The full text of Target 1.2 is: "By 2030, reduce at least by half the proportion of men, women and children of all ages living in poverty in all its dimensions according to national definitions."

Indicators include:
 Indicator 1.2.1: Proportion of population living below the national poverty line.
 Indicator 1.2.2: Proportion of men, women and children of all ages living in poverty in all its dimensions according to national definitions.

Target 1.3: Implement nationally appropriate social protection systems 

The full text of Target 1.3 is: "Implement nationally appropriate social protection systems and measures for all, by 2030 achieve substantial coverage of the poor and the vulnerable."

Indicator 1.3.1 is the "Proportion of population covered by social protection systems, by sex, distinguishing children, unemployed persons, older persons, persons with disabilities, pregnant women, newborns, work-injury victims and the poor and the vulnerable".

Target 1.4: Equal rights to ownership, basic services, technology, and economic resources 
The full text of Target 1.4 is: "By 2030, ensure that all men and women, in particular the poor and the vulnerable, have equal rights to economic resources, as well as access to basic services, ownership and control over land and other forms of property, inheritance, natural resources, appropriate new technology and financial services, including micro-finance."

Its two indicators are:
 Indicator 1.4.1: Proportion of population living in households with access to basic services.
 Indicator 1.4.2: Proportion of total adult population with secure tenure rights to land, (a) with legally recognized documentation, and (b) who perceive their rights to land as secure, by sex and type of tenure.

Target 1.5: Build resilience to environmental, economic, and social disasters 

The full text of Target 1.5 is: "By 2030, build the resilience of the poor and those in vulnerable situations and reduce their exposure and vulnerability to climate-related extreme events and other economic, social and environmental shocks and disasters."

It has four indicators:
 Indicator 1.5.1: Number of deaths, missing persons and directly affected persons attributed to disasters.
 Indicator 1.5.2: Direct economic loss attributed to disasters in relation to global gross domestic product (GDP).
 Indicator 1.5.3: Number of countries that adopt and implement national disaster risk reduction strategies in line with the Sendai Framework for Disaster Risk Reduction 2015–2030.
 Indicator 1.5.4: Proportion of local governments that adopt and implement local disaster risk reduction strategies in line with national disaster risk reduction strategies.

Target 1.a: Mobilization of resources to end poverty 
The text of Target 1.a is: "Ensure significant mobilization of resources from a variety of sources, including through enhanced development cooperation in order to provide adequate and predictable means for developing countries particularly least developed countries."

It has three indicators:
 Indicator 1.a.1: Proportion of domestically generated resources allocated by the government directly to poverty reduction programmes.
 Indicator 1.a.2: Proportion of total government spending on essential services (education, health and social protection).
 Indicator 1.a.3: Sum of total grants and non-debt-creating inflows directly allocated to poverty reduction programmes as a proportion of GDP.
A proposal has been tabled in 2020 to delete Target 1.a.

Target 1.b: Establishment of poverty eradication policy frameworks at all levels 
The full text of Target 1.b is: "Create sound policy frameworks at the national, regional and international levels, based on pro-poor and gender-sensitive development strategies, to support accelerated investment in poverty eradication actions."

It has one indicator: Indicator 1.b.1 is the "Pro-poor public social spending".

Custodian agencies 
Custodian agencies are in charge of measuring the progress of the indicators:

 For Indicator 1.1.1: World Bank (WB) and International Labor Organization (ILO)
 For Indicator 1.2.1: WB
 For Indicator 1.2.2: National Statistics Offices, WB, UNICEF and UNDP
 For Indicator 1.3.1: ILO and WB
 For Indicator 1.4.1: United Nations Human Settlements Programme (UN-HABITAT)
 For Indicator 1.4.2: WB and UN-HABITAT collectively.
 For all four Indicators under Target 1.5: United Nations International Strategy for Disaster Reduction (UNISDR) 
 For Indicator 1.a.1: Organisation for Economic Co-operation and Development (OECD)
 For Indicator 1.a.2: UNESCO-UIS
 For Indicator 1.b.1: UNICEF and Save the Children

Monitoring 
The UN High-Level Political Forum on Sustainable Development (HLPF) meets every year for global monitoring of the SDGs, under the auspices of the United Nations economic and Social Council. High-level progress reports for all the SDGs are published by the United Nations Secretary General.

Challenges

Impact of COVID-19 pandemic 
Eradicating poverty has been made more difficult by the COVID-19 pandemic in 2020. Local and national lockdowns led to a collapse in economic activity that reduced or eliminated sources of income and accelerated poverty.

COVID-19 has caused an increase in global poverty. It was estimated that 71 million people have been pushed into extreme poverty in 2020. The lock down has led to a collapse in economic activities hence causing reduced income leading to accelerated poverty. It is reported that young workers are two times more seemingly to be suffering from unemployment than their elders. There are projections that Sub-Saharan Africa will have the highest rate of increasing poverty because it already has more populations living close to the international poverty line.

COVID-19 has further increased the challenges of achieving zero poverty goals as well as other SDG goals by 2030. Though many alternative measures are being deployed to get the relevant data, the available tools and methods have not been able to sufficiently address the continuously evolving climate.

In order to achieve and sufficiently monitor the progress of SDGs, decision makers as well as stake holders need access to timely and reliable data. As countries got locked down in 2020 due to the COVID-19 pandemic, many data collection activities that rely on direct interviews were suspended. The pandemic interrupted data collection. Decision-makers did not have access to reliable data, especially in the early months.

Furthermore, COVID‑19 exposed the inadequacy in the global food chain. The pandemic is having resounding impact on fragile nations for example, 15.6 million Yemeni nationals are estimated to be practically starving on a daily basis with millions more being driven into a state of distress.

Links with other SDGs 
The SDGs are interlinked as one growth can positively affect another and vice versa. Eradicating poverty can lead to zero hunger (SDG 2) as hunger and poverty are connected.

SDG 1 particularly links to good health and well-being (SDG 3) as eradication of poverty will necessarily increase the standard of living.

Organizations 
Organizations dedicated to eradicating extreme poverty to aid in achieving SDG 1 include: 
 Oxfam International 
 The Organization for Poverty Alleviation and Development (OPAD)
 End Poverty Now 
 The Global Citizen
 The Humanitarian Organization for Poverty Eradication
 Concern Worldwide
 World Relief
 ONE Campaign
 Care International
 Institute for Research on Poverty
 World Vision

References

External links 
 The Global Citizen
 The Humanitarian Organization for Poverty Eradication
UN Sustainable Development Knowledge Platform – SDG 1
“Global Goals” Campaign - SDG 1 
SDG-Track.org - SDG 1
UN SDG 1 in the US

Sustainable development
Sustainable Development Goals